James Edward Burroughs (born January 21, 1958)  is a former American football player who played professionally as a defensive back on the National Football League (NFL) for three seasons with the Baltimore/Indianapolis Colts Burroughs played college football at Michigan State University.

References

External links
 

1958 births
Living people
American football cornerbacks
Baltimore Colts players
Indianapolis Colts players
Michigan State Spartans football players
Pahokee High School alumni
People from Pahokee, Florida
Sportspeople from the Miami metropolitan area
Players of American football from Florida